Pythium spinosum is a plant pathogen infecting a wide variety of crops. Hosts observed to by infected include rice in Taiwan, Primula, Impatiens, soil in Florida, Cucumis melo in South Korea (as damping off), and soybeans in Arkansas USA, China, and Indiana USA.

References

External links
 Index Fungorum
 

Water mould plant pathogens and diseases
Rice diseases
Ornamental plant pathogens and diseases
spinosum